Critique: Studies in Contemporary Fiction is a peer reviewed academic journal published five times per year by Routledge. It focuses on critiques of contemporary fiction from any country, with coverage since the 1950s. It also focuses on new authors with emerging reputations in the contemporary fiction field within the same temporal coverage. The editors-in-chief are Geoffrey Green (San Francisco State University), Donald J. Greiner (University of South Carolina), and Larry McCaffery (San Diego State University).

Abstracting and indexing
This journal is abstracted and indexed by the following databases:
Academic Search Premier
Arts & Humanities Citation Index
Current Contents/Arts and Humanities
International Bibliography of Periodical Literature
Modern Language Association Database
Scopus

References

External links

Routledge academic journals
English-language journals
Publications established in 1956
5 times per year journals
Literary magazines published in the United States
Hybrid open access journals
Magazines published in Atlanta